Pocata is a small town in the mountains of the Moquegua Region of Peru.

References 

Populated places in the Moquegua Region